Robin Voets (born 13 April 2001) is a Dutch footballer who plays as a defender for Derde Divisie club Blauw Geel '38.

Career
Born in Erp, Voets started his career in the youth of RKVV Erp, before moving to the FC Den Bosch academy, where was included in the first-team squad for a few matches in the Eerste Divisie for the 2018–19 season, while appearing for the U21 team in the Hoofdklasse. He made his senior debut the following season, in the 1–1 home match against FC Eindhoven on 23 August 2019. In the match, he came on as a substitute for Danny Verbeek in the 83rd minute.

On 23 May 2021, it was announced that Voets had signed with Blauw Geel '38 competing in the Derde Divisie.

References

External links
 
 

2001 births
Living people
Dutch footballers
Association football defenders
People from Veghel
FC Den Bosch players
Blauw Geel '38 players
Vierde Divisie players
Eerste Divisie players
Derde Divisie players
Footballers from North Brabant